Massimiliano Giacobbo (born 15 July 1974 in Cittadella) is an Italian former professional footballer who played as a midfielder.

External links
 Career summary by playerhistory.com

1974 births
Living people
Italian footballers
Association football midfielders
Serie A players
Serie B players
Juventus F.C. players
Calcio Foggia 1920 players
A.S. Gualdo Casacastalda players
S.S. Arezzo players
Delfino Pescara 1936 players
A.C. Ancona players
A.C.R. Messina players
A.S. Cittadella players
UEFA Cup winning players